The Grenada United Labour Party (GULP) is a political party in Grenada.

History
The party was founded by Eric Gairy in 1950. It contested the first elections held under universal suffrage in 1951, and won six of the eight seats. The 1954 elections saw the same outcome. In the 1957 elections it lost four seats, whilst two other parties, the Grenada National Party and the People's Democratic Movement also won two seats, with the GNP's leader Herbert Blaize becoming leader of the island.

The party regained power after winning eight of the ten seats in the 1961 elections. It lost the 1962 elections to the GNP, before returning to power in the 1967 elections. The party remained in power following the 1972 elections, but Gairy's government became increasingly authoritarian, with his secret police (the Mongoose Gang) threatening the opposition. Following the 1976 elections, which were branded fraudulent by international observers, Gairy was overthrown in a coup in 1979.

After democracy was restored, GULP won only a single seat in the 1984 elections and has since remained in opposition. It formed an alliance with United Labour for the 1999 elections, in which it lost parliamentary representation for the first time since 1951. However, it regained a seat when Michael Baptiste of the ruling New National Party defected to GULP in June 2000.

Gloria Payne Banfield was elected as GULP leader in February 2003, becoming Grenada's first female party leader. In the general elections the party won 3.2% of the vote but again failed to win a seat. For the 2008 elections it formed an alliance with the People's Labour Movement named the Labour Platform. The alliance fielded 11 candidates for the 15 seats, but received only 478 votes and no seats.

Electoral history

House of Representatives elections

References 

Labour parties
Political parties in Grenada
Political parties established in 1950
1950 establishments in Grenada
Main
Republicanism in Grenada